Marcela Guerra Castillo (born 7 November 1959) is a Mexican business administration major and politician from Nuevo León. She was a local deputy in the Congress of Nuevo León and twice federal deputy of the Congress of Mexico. From 2012 to 2018, she was a senator representing the state of Nuevo León in the LXII and LXIII Legislatures.

Early life and education
Marcela Guerra was born on 7 November 1959 in Monterrey, Nuevo León, Mexico, she studied at the Monterrey Institute of Technology where she graduated from the Business Administration School. With studies in Civilization History at the Sorbonne University and the Institut Catholique de Paris in France.

She has participated in several seminaries and courses, among which are: the Executive Seminary "Opportunities and Challenges of Mexico's Future: Leadership and Performance Strategies by Harvard Kennedy School and the Seminary "Foreign Policy and Global Agenda" imparted by the Matias Romero Institute of the Secretariat of Foreign Affairs.

Elected office

Nuevo León's LXIX Legislature 
Local Deputy in the LXIX Legislature of the Congress of Nuevo León via proportional representation of the VIII Local Electoral District of Nuevo León headed by Monterrey, which she occupied from 2000 to 2003. In this Legislature, served on the Committee on Human Development, as well as serving as President of the First Committee of Finance, President of the Municipal Development Committee, Chair of the Civic Causes and Audit Committee and Secretary of the Third Finance Commission.

LIX Legislature of the Mexican Congress 
Federal Deputy in the LIX Legislature of the Mexican Congress during the 2003 - 2006 period where she represented the V Federal Electoral District of Nuevo León headed by Monterrey. In this legislature she was a member of the Committees on Public Service, Oversight of the Superior Auditor of the Federation, Science and Technology, Culture, Federal District and Special Public Service Committee; was also Secretary of the Board of the Standing Committee and the Committee of Radio, Television and Film.

LXI Legislature of the Mexican Congress 
Federal Deputy in the LXI Legislature of the Mexican Congress, representing the V Federal Electoral District of Nuevo León for the second time headed by Monterrey. In this legislature was a member of the Committees on Government and Equity and Gender, likewise served as Secretary of the Commission of Surveillance of the Superior Audit of the Federation.

She was also part of the Committee of the Study Center for the Advancement of Women and Gender Equality of the Chamber of Deputies of Mexico.

As a member of the Inter-Parliamentary Union, she participated in numerous international forums legislating in favor of women.

LXII Legislature of the Mexican Congress 

Senator in the LXII Legislature of the Mexican Congress, representing the state of Nuevo León. In this legislature she is a member of the Committees on Economic Development and on Radio, Television and Cinematography; likewise serves as Secretary of the Commission of Foreign Affairs and President of the North America Foreign Affairs Committee.

She is also the Mexican Congress's Delegation Chairman for ParlAméricas, Mexico's representative in the Administration Council and ParlAméricas's Executive Committee as well as member of the Inter-Parliamentary Union.

Partisan activity 

Served at this party as Secretary General of the Commission on Women's Affairs in the Colosio Foundation in 1996. Has also been Secretary of the National Confederation of Popular Organizations in Nuevo León during the 2007–2009 period.

In the 2012 Mexican federal elections she participated as Mexican Senate Candidate by the state of Nuevo León joint with Ivonne Álvarez, former mayor of Guadalupe municipality, where in a historical manner PRI nominates two women for the Mexican Senate.

Professional career

Cultural organizations 

In the cultural scope was General Coordinator of Monterrey's City Theatre from 1984 to 1987, and from 1991 to 1994 Director of Nuevo León's Museum of History. In 1993 served as General Manager of the project for the construction of the Museum of Mexican History in Monterrey where she worked as Deputy Director until 1996. In 1996 she was named Fundidora Park's Conservation Projects Director, which she managed until 1998.

Civil society organizations 

Was Secretary of the Progressive Liberal Political Association in 2000, Founder and Counselor of the Women’s Plural Pact in 1998 and President of the Bienestar y Vida Association (Welfare and Life Association) from 1998 until 2001.

Books 

Is the author of such books as "Crisol del temple, la historia de la Fundidora de Hierro y Acero de Monterrey", about the history of Fundidora Park, and "Contigo, Manual y Guía para las familias que viven en la discapacidad", helping families who deal with having a disabled family member.

Print and electronic media 

From 1982 to 1987 she collaborated with the newspaper El Norte. In 1987 she hosted the show Buenos Días (Good Morning) in Monterrey's channel 8. In 2002 was political commentator for the news show in Núcleo Radio Monterrey’s Station. Has been collaborator and editorialist in political subjects in Televisa Monterrey and in the Discussion Panel of Milenio Television’s “Según Ellas” show.

References

Living people
1959 births
Politicians from Monterrey
Institutional Revolutionary Party politicians
Members of the Chamber of Deputies (Mexico) for Nuevo León
Women members of the Chamber of Deputies (Mexico)
Members of the Congress of Nuevo León
Monterrey Institute of Technology and Higher Education alumni
21st-century Mexican politicians
21st-century Mexican women politicians
National Autonomous University of Mexico alumni
Senators of the LXII and LXIII Legislatures of Mexico
Members of the Senate of the Republic (Mexico) for Nuevo León
Deputies of the LIX Legislature of Mexico
Deputies of the LXI Legislature of Mexico
Deputies of the LXV Legislature of Mexico
Women members of the Senate of the Republic (Mexico)